The Last Bandit is a 1949 American Western film directed by Joseph Kane and starring Bill Elliott, Lorna Gray and Forrest Tucker. It was a remake by Republic Pictures of the 1941 film The Great Train Robbery with a larger budget and using the studio's Trucolor process. The film was remade again in 1952 as South Pacific Trail.

Plot
Frank Norris, now working as a railroad detective, is implicated in an attempt by his former outlaw colleagues to rob a series of gold shipments.

Partial cast
 Wild Bill Elliott as Frank Norris / Frank Plummer 
 Lorna Gray as Kate Foley / Kate Sampson  
 Forrest Tucker as Jim Plummer 
 Andy Devine as Casey Brown  
 Jack Holt as Mort Pemberton 
 Minna Gombell as Winnie McPhail 
 Grant Withers as Ed Bagley  
 Virginia Brissac as Kate's Mother  
 Louis Faust as Hank Morse  
 Stanley Andrews as Jeff Baldwin 
 Martin Garralaga as Patrick Moreno  
 Joseph Crehan as Local No. 44 Engineer  
 Charles Middleton as Blindfolded Circuit Rider

References

Bibliography
 Fetrow, Alan G. Feature Films, 1940-1949: a United States Filmography. McFarland, 1994.

External links

1949 films
1949 Western (genre) films
Remakes of American films
American heist films
American Western (genre) films
Films directed by Joseph Kane
Films set in Nevada
Rail transport films
Republic Pictures films
Trucolor films
1940s heist films
1940s English-language films
1940s American films